Water polo events were contested at the 1973 Summer Universiade in Moscow, Soviet Union.

References
 Universiade water polo medalists on HickokSports

1973 Summer Universiade
Universiade
1973
1973 Summer Universiade